Hydroxetamine (3'-hydroxy-2-oxo-PCE, O-desmethylmethoxetamine, HXE) is a recreational designer drug from the arylcyclohexylamine family, with dissociative effects. It is known as an active metabolite of the dissociative designer drug methoxetamine, but has also been sold in its own right since late 2019.

See also 
 3-HO-PCP
 4-Keto-PCP
 Desmetramadol
 Deoxymethoxetamine
 Fluorexetamine

References 

Arylcyclohexylamines
Designer drugs
Dissociative drugs
Phenols
Ketones
Secondary amines